Tomislav Mohorić (September 27, 1926 - January 28, 1990) was a Croatian swimmer and water polo player. After ending his playing career he became a water polo and handball coach.

Career
Mohorić played for VK Primorje and during his playing career the club was in always in the top five of the Yugoslav Water Polo Championship. He also played for the newly established handball team of Primorje. In 1956 he ended his playing career and started his  coaching.

In 1958 Mohorić alongside Eduard Domazet and Dmitar Trbović founded the handball club Exportdrvo and Mohorić led the men's and women's senior team. His most biggest achievement was with the men's team when the club gained promotion to the Yugoslav Second League and finished in second in the league. During its time the club was the best handball club in Rijeka and a force to be reckoned with in Yugoslav handball. The club was disbanded in 1963.

During the 1960s and 1970s he was the tehniko of VK Primorje most notably to the team that was second in the LEN Cup Winners' Cup in 1976. Later during the 1980s he was a board member of VK Primorje.

Honours

RK Primorje
Rijeka League
Winner (1): 1955-56

ŽRK Primorje
Rijeka League
Winner (1): 1956-57
Croatian Championship
Fourth place (1): 1956-57

RK Exportdrvo
Rijeka League
Winner (2): 1957-58, 1960–61
Rijeka Zone League
Winner (1): 1962-63
Yugoslav Second League (West)
Second place (1): 1961-62

ŽRK Exportdrvo
Rijeka League
Winner (2): 1959-60, 1960–61
Rijeka Zone League
Winner (1): 1962-63

References

Sources
Petar Orgulić - 50 godina rukometa u Rijeci (2005), Adria public

1926 births
1990 deaths
Croatian male water polo players
Yugoslav male water polo players
Yugoslav male handball players
Sportspeople from Rijeka
RK Zamet coaches